The 2010 Meath Senior Football Championship was the 118th edition of the Meath GAA's premier club Gaelic football tournament for senior graded teams in County Meath, Ireland. The tournament consists of 17 teams, with the winner going on to represent Meath in the Leinster Senior Club Football Championship. The championship starts with a group stage, and then progresses to a knock out stage.
 
Seneschalstown were the defending champions after they defeated Wolfe Tones, after a replay,  in the previous year's final.

Oldcastle were promoted after claiming the 2009 Meath Intermediate Football Championship title, their first year in the senior grade since being relegated in 2002.

On 26 September 2010, Skryne claimed their 13th Senior Championship title when they defeated Seneschalstown 0-21 to 4-8 in a very entertaining final. The game looked like it would go to extra time, but with the last kick of the game, Skryne's Paddy O'Rourke scored a 45 and sealed the win for Skryne. Aidan Tuite, the Skryne captain, lifted the Keegan Cup while Paddy O'Rourke claimed the 'Man of the Match' award.

St. Ultan's were relegated after just 2 years as a senior club.

Team changes
The following teams have changed division since the 2009 championship season:

To S.F.C.
Promoted from I.F.C.
 Oldcastle  -  (Intermediate Champions)

Participating teams
The teams that took part in the 2010 Meath Senior Football Championship were:

Group stage
There are three groups called Group A, B and C. The three top finishers in Group A and B; and the first and second placed teams in Group C,  qualify for the quarter-finals. The three teams that finish last in their groups go through to a round-robin relegation play off. The loser gets relegated to the Intermediate Division.

Group A

Round 1:
 Seneschalstown 3-12, 0-13 St. Ultan's, Pairc Tailteann, 17/4/2010,
 Walterstown 2-11, 2-10 Dunshaughlin, Pairc Tailteann, 18/4/2010,
 Rathkenny 0-9, 1-6 Blackhall Gaels, Pairc Tailteann, 18/4/2010,

Round 2:
 Blackhall Gaels 1-19, 0-9 St. Ultan's, Skryne, 28/4/2010,
 Seneschalstown 0-11, 1-7 Dunshaughlin, Ratoath, 1/5/2010,
 Rathkenny 0-10, 0-8 Walterstown, Pairc Tailteann, 2/5/2010,

Round 3:
 Blackhall Gaels 0-6,  1-9 Walterstown, Ashbourne, 28/5/2010,
 Dunshaughlin 3-12, 0-3 St. Ultan's, Pairc Tailteann, 28/5/2010,
 Rathkenny 0-9 , 0-8 Seneschalstown, Simonstown, 30/5/2010,

Round 4:
 Walterstown 2-8 , 1-9 St.  Ultan's, Simonstown, 17/7/2010,
 Rathkenny 1-7, 1-6 Dunshaughlin, Pairc Tailteann, 18/7/2010,
 Blackhall Gaels 1-9, 2-8 Seneschalstown, Ashbourne, 18/7/2010

Round 5: 
 Dunshaughlin 0-9, 1-10 Blackhall Gaels, Summerhill, 6/8/2010,
 Rathkenny 0-9, 0-8 St. Ultan's, Meath Hill, 8/8/2010,
 Walterstown 0-15, 0-7 Seneschalstown, Pairc Tailteann, 8/8/2010.

Group B

Simonstown Gaels finish bottom of Group B because of their head-to-head result against Trim

Round 1:
 Wolfe Tones 1-8,  1-10 St. Peter's Dunboyne, Skryne, 17/4/2010,
 Skryne 0-11, 1-8 Simonstown Gaels, Seneschalstown, 18/4/2010,
 St. Patrick's 4-6, 2-12 Trim, Walterstown, 18/4/2010,

Round 2:
 Simonstown Gaels 1-11, 2-13 St. Peter's Dunboyne, Skryne, 1/5/2010,
 Wolfe Tones 0-11, 1-3 Trim, Pairc Tailteann, 2/5/2010,
 Skryne 0-17, 1-6 St. Patrick's, Ashbourne, 2/5/2010,

Round 3:
 Skryne 1-6, 1-13 Wolfe Tones, Pairc Tailteann, 29/5/2010,
 Trim 1-8,  0-12 St. Peter's Dunboyne, Summerhill, 30/5/2010,
 Simonstown Gaels 0-15, 1-6 St. Patrick's, Donore, 30/5/2010,

Round 4:
 Skryne 2-16, 4-6 Trim, Dunsany, 18/7/2010,
 Simonstown Gaels 2-5, 1-10 Wolfe Tones, Pairc Tailteann, 18/7/2010,
 St. Patrick's 2-14, 2-11 St. Peter's Dunboyne, Ratoath, 18/7/2010,

Round 5:
 Skryne 2-10 , 2-6 St. Peters's Dunboyne, Waltertown, 8/8/2010,
 Simonstown Gaels 0-9, 1-7 Trim, Dunderry, 8/8/2010,
 St. Patrick's 2-10, 2-10 Wolfe Tones, Seneschalstown, 8/8/2010.

Group C

Round 1:
 Oldcastle 0-10, 2-9 Navan O'Mahony's, Athboy, 18/4/2010,
 Summerhill 0-17, 2-6 Donaghmore/Ashbourne, Dunshaughlin, 18/4/2010,
 Duleek/Bellewstown  -  Bye,

Round 2:
 Duleek/Bellewstown 0-9, 1-9 Donaghmore/Ashbourne, Donore, 30/4/2010,
 Summerhill 1-4, 3-8 Navan O'Mahony's, Dunsany, 2/5/2010,
 Oldcastle  -  Bye,

Round 3:
 Duleek/Bellewstown 1-7, 1-7 Oldcastle, Pairc Tailteann, 30/5/2010,
 Navan O'Mahony's 1-7, 2-9 Donaghmore/Ashbourne, Pairc Tailteann, 30/5/2010,
 Summerhill  -  Bye,

Round 4:
 Oldcastle 0-12,  2-13 Donaghmore/Ashbourne, Pairc Tailteann, 16/7/2010,
 Summerhill 2-8, 1-15 Duleek/Bellewstown, Dunshaughlin, 18/7/2010,
 Navan O'Mahonys  -  Bye,

Round 5:
 Duleek/Bellewstown 1-9, 0-10 Navan O'Mahony's, Skryne, 8/8/2010,
 Oldcastle 0-10, 1-8 Summerhill, Pairc Tailteann, 8/8/2010,
 Donaghmore/Ashbourne  -  Bye,

Knock-out Stage

Relegation Play Off

Game 1: St. Ultans 1-12,  0-17 Simonstown Gaels, Kilberry, 21/8/2010,

Game 2: St. Ultans 2-3, 2-13 Oldcastle, Ballinlough, 29/8/2010,

Finals

Quarter-Finals
 Donaghmore/Ashbourne 1-8, 2-11 Skryne, Pairc Tailteann, 21/8/2010,
 Rathkenny 1-11, 0-11 Duleek/Bellewstown, Pairc Tailteann, 22/8/2010, AET
 Seneschalstown 2-12, 2-7 Wolfe Tones, Pairc Tailteann, 22/8/2010,
 Walterstown 0-11, 0-13 St. Peter's Dunboyne, Ratoath, 22/8/2010,

Semi-Finals
 Rathkenny 0-8, 0-10 Seneschalstown, Pairc Tailteann, 12/9/2010,
 Skryne 2-9, 2-8 St. Peter's Dunboyne, Pairc Tailteann, 12/9/2010,

Final
 Seneschalstown 4-8, 0-21 Skryne, Pairc Tailteann, 26/9/2010,

References

External links

Meath Senior Football Championship
Meath Senior Football Championship